The Žďákov Bridge is a steel arch bridge that spans the Vltava between Orlík nad Vltavou and Kostelec nad Vltavou in Písek District, Czech Republic.  At the time of its completion in 1967, it was the longest arch bridge in Czechoslovakia and the supported arch bridge with the longest span in the world.

It is situated on the road between Tábor and Plzeň, near Orlík nad Vltavou.

Construction of the bridge was started simultaneously with the construction of Orlík Dam in 1957. The price of the bridge was 71 million CSK and was completed in 1967. It was named after the nearby village, flooded during the construction of the Orlík Dam. In 2001 the bridge was awarded as Bridge of the Century in the category of steel road bridges by Czech engineers during the Mosty 2001 symposium.

See also
 List of longest arch bridge spans

References

External links

 
 Žďákovský Bridge in HighestBridges.com database

Deck arch bridges
Bridges completed in 1967
Bridges over the Vltava
Steel bridges
Písek District